Smash the System: Singles and More (2001) is a double-CD greatest hits album by Saint Etienne. The compilation samples music from most of their releases spanning the years from 1990 to 1999. Most tracks are featured in their single or edit versions with the exception of 'Join Our Club' which is a new mix as the original sounded too 'muddy'. Smash The System was also going to be the CD debut of 'Lover Plays The Bass', but the band 'forgot' to include it.

In 2005 the album was re-released as Smash the System: Singles 1990-99 containing only the singles. The newer version is only a single disc and uses a green version of the same artwork. This edition of the album replicates 13 of the 14 tracks that appear on the group's first singles album 1995's Too Young to Die – The Singles. Notable differences include the first appearance of the radio edit of "Avenue" on a Saint Etienne album, the 2001 remix of "Join Our Club", the inclusion of the US version  of "Kiss and Make Up", and the omission of "I Was Born on Christmas Day". The compilation also has different shorter edits of "Sylvie" and "The Bad Photographer" that do not appear on Smash the System: Singles and More. The version of "Kiss and Make Up" also differs on both compilations, as the version featured on the 2005 edition is slightly shorter than the one included on the 2001 edition.

Track listing

2CD: Heavenly / HVNLP32CD (UK)

CD: Heavenly / HVNLP 52CD (UK) - Smash the System: Singles 1990-99

Personnel

Saint Etienne are:

 Sarah Cracknell (Aries, super, #9 iron)
 Bob Stanley (Capricorn, 36, usual stripped trousers)
 Pete Wiggs (Taurus, young one, like a hurricane)

Charts

References

2001 greatest hits albums
Saint Etienne (band) compilation albums
Heavenly Recordings compilation albums